The Long March 3A, also known as the Chang Zheng 3A, CZ-3A and LM-3A, is a Chinese orbital carrier rocket design. It is a 3-stage rocket, and is usually used to place communications satellites and Beidou navigation satellites into geosynchronous transfer orbits.

It has formed the basis of the Long March 3B, which is a heavier version with four liquid booster rockets.

Launches
Long March 3A rockets have been launched from Launch Areas 2 and 3 at the Xichang Satellite Launch Center.

List of launches

Technical data
LM-3A is a 3-stage launch vehicle developed on the basis of LM-3 and LM-2C. Its third stage is powered by cryogenic propellants: liquid hydrogen and liquid oxygen. It is dedicated for launching spacecraft into GTO. Its launch capability for GTO mission is 2,600 kg. The fairing static envelope is 3m in diameter.

References

Long March (rocket family)
Vehicles introduced in 1994